Christian Brentano (24 January 1784, Frankfurt – 27 October 1851, Frankfurt) was a German writer and Catholic publicist. He was the brother of Clemens Brentano and Bettina von Arnim, famous German writers of the Romantic school, and the father of the philosopher Franz Brentano.

Brentano is noted for editing and releasing nine volumes of his brother's work in 1851–55.  He survived Clemens, who actually died in 1842 while visiting Christian in Aschaffenburg.

References
 Rochus von Liliencron, "Brentano, Christian." In: Allgemeine Deutsche Biographie. Vol. 3, Duncker & Humblot, Leipzig 1876, p. 309ff.

1784 births
1851 deaths
Writers from Frankfurt
German people of Italian descent
German poets
German male poets